John Lorimer may refer to:
John Lorimer (doctor) (1732–1795), British surgeon, mathematician, politician and cartographer
John Gordon Lorimer (minister) (1804–1868), Scottish minister and author
John Henry Lorimer (1856–1936), Scottish painter
John Gordon Lorimer (civil servant) (1870–1914), British officer in the Indian Civil Service
Sir John Lorimer (British Army officer) (born 1962), British general